Elsa Amanda Edgren (born 24 August 1993) is a Swedish professional footballer who plays as a midfielder for Spanish club Sporting de Huelva.

Playing career

Club

Göteborg FC
Originally from Kåhög, Sweden, Edgren signed with Swedish side, Kopparbergs/Göteborg FC in the Damallsvenskan, the top division of women's soccer in Sweden, at age 18. She made her debut for the club during a match against Linköping FC in which the teams tied 0-0. Edgren served an assist to Jenny Hallstenson helping Göteborg defeat KIF Örebro 3-1 on 6 August 2011. She finished the 2011 season having played in six matches. Göteborg won the Swedish Cup the same year.

During the 2012 season, Edgren made 1 start in 11 appearances for Göteborg. She scored two goals during the season: one during a 1-2 defeat against Vittsjö and the other during a 5-0 victory against Umeå. Göteborg was runner-up for the Swedish Super Cup 2012 losing 2-1 to LdB FC Malmö. In April 2013, Göteborg defeated 2012 Damallsvenskan champions, Tyresö FF to win the Swedish Supercup. Edgren returned to the squad for the 2013 season. She scored her first goal of the season during a 5-1 win against Sunnanå on 13 April.

International
Edgren has represented Sweden at the U-20 level.

Honors and awards

Team
 Winner, Swedish Cup Women, 2011-12
 Winner, Super Cup Women, 2013

References

External links
 
 Kopparbergs/Göteborg FC player profile
 
 

Living people
1993 births
Swedish women's footballers
Expatriate sportspeople in Spain
Women's association football midfielders
BK Häcken FF players
Damallsvenskan players
Kristianstads DFF players
Sweden women's international footballers
People from Strömstad Municipality
Sportspeople from Västra Götaland County
21st-century Swedish women